Drakino is a rural locality (a khutor) in Repyovskoye Rural Settlement, Repyovsky District, Voronezh Oblast, Russia. The population was 131 as of 2010.

Geography 
Drakino is located 6 km northwest of Repyovka (the district's administrative centre) by road. Repyovka is the nearest rural locality.

References 

Rural localities in Repyovsky District